Street Sk8er 2 - known as Street Skater 2 in Europe and  in Japan - is the official sequel to Street Sk8er, released in 2000. It was released on the PlayStation Network on March 12, 2009 in Europe, and on October 12, 2011 in Japan.

Soundtrack
 8stops7 - My Would-Be Savior
 8stops7 - Satisfied
 Citizen King - Better Days (And the Bottom Drops Out)
 Citizen King - Under the Influence
 Deftones - My Own Summer (Shove It) (Mid Winter Mix)
 Del the Funky Homosapien - Catch All This
 Ministry - 10/10
 Shootyz Groove - Blow Your Top
 Shootyz Groove - Mad for It
 Showoff - Coalition
 Static-X - Push It
 The Chick Magnets - Fear of Girls

Reception

The game received above-average reviews, much better than its predecessor, according to the review aggregation website GameRankings. In Japan, Famitsu gave it a score of 27 out of 40.

References

External links
 

2000 video games
Atelier Double games
Electronic Arts games
Microcabin games
Multiplayer and single-player video games
PlayStation (console) games
PlayStation Network games
Skateboarding video games
Video game sequels
Video games developed in Japan